Reginaldo Aparecido Estevao (born 28 February 1977 in Brazil) is a Brazilian former footballer who is last known to have been assigned to Sengkang Punggol of the Singaporean S.League in 2008.

Singapore

Securing a deal with Singapore's Sengkang Punggol, the antecedent of Hougang United, in mid-2008, Estevao opened his goal count for the Cheetahs in a 2-1 loss to Geylang International, losing his brother Renato in a car crash a few weeks earlier, affecting his performance.

References

External links 
 at Soccerway

Brazilian expatriate sportspeople in Indonesia
Living people
Association football forwards
Brazilian expatriate sportspeople in Singapore
Expatriate footballers in Singapore
Brazilian expatriate footballers
Singapore Premier League players
1977 births
Hougang United FC players
Brazilian footballers
Expatriate footballers in Indonesia
Perseman Manokwari players